Josephine McClements is a former camogie player, winner of the Gradam Tailte award for skill tests in 1982.

Career
She was the playmaker for the Antrim team defeated in the 1973 All Ireland final by Cork and returned to win an All Ireland medal in Antrim's 1979 defeat of Tipperary.

References

Living people
Antrim camogie players
Year of birth missing (living people)